Milford is an unincorporated community in Bracken County, in the U.S. state of Kentucky.  The ZIP Code for Milford is 41061.

History
Milford was founded in 1831, and named for the nearby watermill on a ford of the Licking River. A post office has been in operation at Milford since 1832.

References

Unincorporated communities in Bracken County, Kentucky
Unincorporated communities in Kentucky